Acraea goetzei is a butterfly in the family Nymphalidae. It is found in southern Malawi, eastern Zambia, southern and western Tanzania, south-western Uganda, Rwanda, Burundi, the Democratic Republic of the Congo (southern Kivu) and Zimbabwe.

Description

A. goetzei is similar above to an Acraea serena without spots at the distal margin, but differs in having the hindwing black at the base as far as vein 2; the forewing is also narrowly black at the base; the large hindmarginal spot of the fore wing covers cellules 1 a to 3 to beyond the middle and almost the whole of the cell and is orange-red, like the entirely free subapical band; the median band of the hindwing has the same colour or is somewhat tinged with yellowish at the inner margin; it is only 3 mm. in breadth at the inner margin, but widens anteriorly and in cellules 4 and 5 has a breadth of about 9 mm. The ground of the hindwing is light yellow and the basal half is almost without markings in the middle, the cell having only a black dot near the base and 1 or 2 small dots at the apex; the discal dots in 3 to 5 entirely absent; cellule 1 c, on the other hand, has a broad red stripe from the base to the discal dot and there is another similar streak in cellule 7, bounded at each side by a black transverse streak. The gaily coloured marginal band, as in ventura, is much narrower in cellules 4 to 7 than in 1 b to 3 and basally bordered by a fine dark line; the veins are black and bordered at each side by a whitish line; the marginal spots are broad and short, proximally rounded and continued by broad red, black-edged stripes which reach the proximal boundary-line. Nyassaland and German East Africa (in the interior).

Biology
The habitat consists of montane forests.

Adults are on wing year round, with a peak from March to June.

The larvae feed on Triumfetta rhomboidea.

Taxonomy
Acraea goetzei is a member of the Acraea bonasia species group; see Acraea.

See also Pierre & Bernaud, 2014

References

Thurau, 1903 Neue Lepidopteren aus Ost- und Central-Afrika, im Königl. zoologischen Museum zu Berlin Berl. ent. Z. 48 : 301-314

External links

 Images representing  Acraea goetzi at Bold

Butterflies described in 1903
goetzei
Butterflies of Africa